The  doubles Tournament at the 2006 Pacific Life Open took place between March 6 and March 19 on the outdoor hard courts of the Indian Wells Tennis Garden in Indian Wells, United States. Lisa Raymond and Samantha Stosur won the title, defeating Virginia Ruano Pascual and Meghann Shaughnessy in the final.

Seeds

Draw

Finals

Top half

Bottom half

Qualifying

Seeds

Qualifiers
  Anna Chakvetadze /  Elena Vesnina

Qualifying draw

References

External links
 Official results archive (ITF)
 Official results archive (WTA)

Pacific Life Open - Doubles
Women's Doubles